The Gartland classification is a system of categorizing supracondylar humerus fractures, clinically useful as it predicts the likelihood of associated neurovascular injury, such as anterior interosseous nerve neurapraxia or brachial artery disruption.

Classification

References

Further reading

External links
 Orthobullets

Injuries of shoulder and upper arm
Orthopedic classifications